Bunny Cowan Clark (September 8, 1935 – October 2015) was an American nuclear physicist and a Professor of Physics at Ohio State University. She attended Kansas State University for both her bachelor's and master's degrees. She earned her doctorate in physics from Wayne State University in 1973.

Personal life and education

Clark was born on September 8, 1935 in El Paso, Texas.. She gained her B. S. degree from Kansas State University in 1958, followed by her M.S. degree in 1963 with a thesis about Frequency spectrum of elastic waves in body centered cubic lattices with Basil Curnutte and  Robert Herman supervising her research. She then studied with A. M. Saperstein for her doctorate at Wayne State University.

Career

Clark joined the Physics faculty at Ohio State University in 1981, becoming a professor in 1986. Her research was within nuclear theoretical physics. At the 2001 Commencement Address for Ohio State, she spoke candidly about her experience as a woman in physics. 

Clark was a fierce advocate for women in physics. She helped create the American Physical Society Committee on Status of Women in Physics. Clark quit accepting graduate students after an incident in 1994, in which a female graduate student was dismissed despite receiving higher scores than some of the male students that were retained.

Clark was well known for her generosity. She worked tirelessly to help young faculty members and graduate students secure funding.

Publications
Clarke was the author or co-author of over 60 scientific publications. These included:

 E. D. Cooper, S. Hama, and B. C. Clark (2009) Global Dirac optical potential from helium to lead. Physical Review C 80 034605
 L. Kurth Kerr, B. C. Clark, S. Hama, L. Ray, G. W. Hoffmann (2000) Theoretical and Experimental K+ + Nucleus Total and Reaction Cross Sections from the KDP-RIA Model. Progress of Theoretical Physics 103 (2) 321–335
 E. D. Cooper, S. Hama, B. C. Clark, and R. L. Mercer (1993) Global Dirac phenomenology for proton-nucleus elastic scattering Physical Review C 47 297
 E. D. Cooper, B. C. Clark, R. Kozack, S. Shim, S. Hama, J. I. Johansson, H. S. Sherif, R. L. Mercer, and B. D. Serot (1987) Global optical potentials for elastic p +40 Ca scattering using the Dirac equation. Physical Review C 36 2170(R)
 J. B. Bellicard, P. Bounin, R. F. Frosch, R. Hofstadter, J. S. McCarthy, F. J. Uhrhane, M. R. Yearian, B. C. Clark, R. Herman, and D. G. Ravenhall (1967) Scattering of 750-MeV Electrons by Calcium Isotopes. Phys. Rev. Lett 19 527

She also published about women in physics, including:
 Mildred S Dresselhaus, Judy R Franz and Bunny C Clark (1994) Interventions to increase the participation of women in physics Science 263  (5152) 1392 - 1393

Recognition and legacy
Clark was named a Fellow of the American Physical Society (APS), after a nomination from the APS Division of Nuclear Physics, "for contributions to relativistic treatment of nucleon scattering from nuclei".

Clark and her husband Tom created the Bunny and Thomas Clark Scholarship Endowment Fund at the Ohio State University Physics Department. The endowment awards scholarships to both undergraduate and graduate students, with an emphasis on underrepresented groups such as women and minorities. After the deaths of her and her husband, her colleague and friend Robert Mercer and the Mercer Family Foundation established the Bunny C. Clark Student Support Fund.

References

1935 births
2015 deaths
People from El Paso, Texas
20th-century American physicists
American women physicists
Kansas State University alumni
Wayne State University alumni
Ohio State University faculty
Fellows of the American Physical Society
American women academics
21st-century American women scientists
20th-century American women scientists
21st-century American physicists
Scientists from Texas